William Shew (1820–1903) was a prominent American photographer in the 19th century.  He made a name for himself as a Daguerrotype portrait artist in the United States. He maintained a mobile studio in a wagon that he called his "Daguerrotype Saloon."

Shew was born near Watertown, New York on 23 March 1820.  He studied daguerrotype photography with Samuel F. B. Morse, as did his brothers Truman, Jacob, and Myron. All four of the Shew brothers worked for photographer John Plumbe, who opened studios in various cities; William Shew worked in Plumbe's Boston studio from 1841 to 1844 before setting up his own daguerreian case manufacturing business, William Shew and Company, and pursuing studio work in partnership with daguerreotypist Marsena Cannon.  In this period, Shew was a member of the Massachusetts Anti-Slavery Society. 

In 1851, Shew followed his brother Jacob to California and set up a studio in San Francisco; he became well known for his portrait work. He was recruited by John Wesley Jones to take daguerreotypes of California for Jones's planned Great Pantoscope of California, the Rocky Mountains, Salt Lake City, Nebraska and Kansas.  In 1851, he set up the "Moveable Daguerreotype Saloon" on Dupont Street, later moving it to a lot on Washington Street, opposite the Alta California newspaper office.  He later occupied studios in more orthodox addresses along Clay, Montgomery, and Kearny streets. He is presumed the author of a July 1854 article "Photography" in The Pioneer, or, California Monthly Magazine in which he commented on the current state of photographic art and daguerreotype studios.

When Japan's first diplomatic mission to the United States arrived in San Francisco in 1860, a young Yukichi Fukuzawa, then part of the embassy staff, sat for a photo in Shew's studio, in what would become one of the most famous photographs in early Japanese history as it also featured Shew's daughter Theodora, one of the first photographs of a Caucasian woman seen in Japan.

Shew was active in local political and social groups in the 1850s and 1860s, holding the first San Francisco Free-Soil Convention at his rooms on the Plaza (8 October 1852); he served briefly on the Board of Education and hosted meetings of the Temperance Society.  He was the most successful of the Shew brothers in photography; Truman died young (1848), Jacob suffered financial losses and committed suicide in 1879, and Myron worked in a variety of jobs including photography, manufacturing, and merchandising.

Shew was married twice. In 1847 he married Elizabeth Marie Studley (1819-1889) in Boston; their daughter Theodora Alice was born in 1848.  After Elizabeth's death from typhoid in 1889, Shew and Annie Katherine Haven (1849-1930) were married in San Francisco in 1891.  Shew died in San Francisco on 5 February 1903.


Works

References

Further reading

External links 

 The Daguerreian Society: California Daguerrotypes (Archived at The Wayback Machine)
 Silver and Gold - Shew's Daguerreian Saloon

Commercial photographers
Photographers from California
1820 births
1903 deaths
19th-century American photographers